The 1951 NYU Violets football team was an American football team that represented New York University as an independent during the 1951 college football season. 

In their second season under head coach Hugh Devore, the Violets compiled a 1–7 record, and were outscored 329–79.

The team played two games at Triborough Stadium on Randalls Island in Manhattan. The rest of its schedule was on the road. NYU played no games at its on-campus home field, Ohio Field in University Heights, Bronx.

Schedule

References

NYU
NYU Violets football seasons
NYU Violets football